WQCY (103.9 FM) is a radio station in Quincy, Illinois known as "Q104". WQCY is currently owned by STARadio Corporation.

History
WQCY previously aired  a classic rock format as "103.9 The Fox", a sports format and before that aired 80's music known on air as "My 103.9".

See also
List of media outlets in Quincy, Illinois

Former logo

External links

QCY-FM